Hoseynabad-e Arab Sheybani (also Romanized as Ḩoseynābād-e ʿArab Sheybānī; also known as Ḩoseynābād) is a village in Khobriz Rural District, in the Central District of Arsanjan County, Fars Province, Iran. At the 2006 census, its population was 187, in 40 families.

References 

Populated places in Arsanjan County